Anna Maria Carew (fl. 1660s) was an English miniature painter.

She is documented as having received a pension of 100 pounds from Charles II of England after the Restoration in 1662, which was raised to 200 pounds 10 days later. Though she was paid for miniature copies of portraits, no known works survive in the Royal Collection. Her works follow the style of the popular court miniature painter Samuel Cooper. She was probably related to the artist Richard Carew (antiquary).

References

Painting of Madonna and Child in the Cleveland Museum of Art
CAREW, Anna Maria - Miniaturist in Bénézit

17th-century births
Miniature painting
English women painters
Year of death unknown